Kroonia is a genus of moths in the family Metarbelidae.

Species
 Kroonia adamauensis Lehmann, 2010
 Kroonia carteri Lehmann, 2010
 Kroonia dallastai Lehmann, 2010
 Kroonia fumealis (Janse, 1925)
 Kroonia heikeae Lehmann, 2010
 Kroonia honeyi Lehmann, 2010
 Kroonia murphyi Lehmann, 2010
 Kroonia natalica (Hampson, 1910)
 Kroonia politzari Lehmann, 2010

References

 , 2010: A new genus of Metarbelidae (Lepidoptera: Cossoidea)  from the Afrotropical Region with the description of seven new species. Esperiana Buchreihe zur Entomologie Memoir 5: 294–322.

External links

Natural History Museum Lepidoptera generic names catalog

Metarbelinae